Semelholstinden is a mountain in Lom Municipality in Innlandet county, Norway. The mountain is surrounded by several other notable mountains including Urdadalstindene, Søre Hellstugutinden, and Nestsøre Hellstugutinden to the east; Semeltinden to the southeast; Høgvagltindene, Visbretinden, and Langvasshøi to the southwest; Kyrkja and Kyrkjeoksli to the west; and Tverrbytthornet to the northwest.

See also
List of mountains of Norway by height

References

Jotunheimen
Lom, Norway
Mountains of Innlandet